The Vogelkop ringtail possum (Pseudochirulus schlegeli) is a species of marsupial in the family Pseudocheiridae. It is endemic to the Vogelkop Peninsula, West Papua, Indonesia.

References

Possums
Mammals of Western New Guinea
Mammals described in 1884
Taxonomy articles created by Polbot
Marsupials of New Guinea